Wanrong Township or Wanrung Township is a mountain indigenous township located in the west of Hualien County, Taiwan, and has a population of 6,154 inhabitants and 8 villages.

The elevation and climate changes greatly with the mountains of Central Range, and the adverse elevation is about 600 m. The main inhabitants are Truku people, Bunun people and Atayal people of the Taiwanese aborigines, and most economic activity is agriculture, which located in the small plain near Fenglin Township. The abundant resources of tourism has not been developed.

Administrative divisions
The township comprises six villages: Hongye, Jianqing, Mayuan, Mingli, Wanrong and Xilin.

Tourist attractions
 Hongye Hot Spring
 Lintian Mountain Forestry Center
 Mount Erzih Hot Spring
 Qicai Lake
 Wanrong Hot Spring
 Fuyuan National Forest Recreation Area (Butterfly Valley)
 Lintianshan (molisaka) Lumbering Culture Area

Transportation
Wanrong Station, Hualien-Taitung Line of TRA (located in Fengling Township)
Provincial Highway 9
Provincial Highway 16 (partial)
Hualien County Road No.16
Hualien County Road No.45

Notable natives
 Bokeh Kosang, actor and singer

References

External links

Wanrung Township Office, Hualien County 

Townships in Hualien County